This is a list of defunct airlines of Algeria.

See also

 List of airlines of Algeria
 List of airports in Algeria

References

 
Algeria